This is a list of the number-one songs of 2020 in Puerto Rico. The airplay charts are published by Monitor Latino, based on airplay across radio stations in Puerto Rico utilizing the Radio Tracking Data, LLC in real time. Charts are compiled from Monday to Sunday.
Besides the General chart, Monitor Latino publishes "Pop", "Anglo", "Urbano" and "Tropical" charts.

Chart history (Monitor Latino)

General

Pop

References

2020 in Puerto Rico
Puerto Rico
Puerto Rico